Atuna excelsa subsp. racemosa, synonym Atuna racemosa, is a tree in the family Chrysobalanaceae. The epithet  is from the Latin meaning "clustered", referring to the inflorescence. The tree is widely known as tabon-tabon in the Philippines, where the fruits have been traditionally used for the preparation of kinilaw (a local dish of raw fish in vinegar or citrus juices) for almost a thousand years.

Description
The smooth bark is grey to black. The flowers are blue or white.

Distribution and habitat
Atuna excelsa subsp. racemosa is found widely in Thailand, Malesia and the South Pacific islands of Oceania. Its habitat is mixed dipterocarp forests, also in swamps and along rivers, from sea level to  altitude.

Uses
The fruit is made into a putty for sealing canoes in the Pacific islands. Oil from the seeds is used as a scent. Leaves are used as thatch in Fiji.

In the Philippines, where the tree is known as tabon-tabon, juice from the grated flesh of the fruits is used to neutralize the fishy taste and the acidity of the raw seafood dish kinilaw. The remains of halved tabon-tabon fruits alongside cut fish bones have been recovered from the Balangay archeological excavation site in Butuan (dated c. 10th to 13th century AD) indicating that this cooking practice is almost a thousand years old.

References

excelsa racemosa
Trees of Thailand
Trees of Malesia
Flora of Papuasia
Flora of the Southwestern Pacific
Taxa named by Constantine Samuel Rafinesque